= SoccerGrow =

- SoccerGrow's logo
- Formation: June 2008
- Type: NGO
- Legal status: Charity
- Purpose: humanitarian, soccer
- Headquarters: Columbia, MO
- Region served: Worldwide
- Affiliations: SoccerPro
- Website: http://www.soccergrow.org/

SoccerGrow is a soccer charity aimed at supporting the international soccer community, specifically lower-income regions. SoccerGrow was started in June 2008 by the founders of the soccer retailer SoccerPro, with the intention of getting its customer base involved with soccer charity work. SoccerGrow works with other charities, such as Kicks for Kenya, by donating soccer products to them to distribute.

== Purpose statement ==
SoccerGrow is a soccer charity started in June, 2008 by SoccerPro.com to tap into the power and potential of the SoccerPro customer base in order to support and grow positive change in the world. Soccer has a unique power to heal wounds across barriers of race, class, language, gender, and age. Therefore, the main mission of SoccerGrow is to create and maintain a network of partnerships with charities, not-for-profit organizations and individuals through which SoccerPro can donate soccer equipment and money to those in need.

— SoccerGrow.org
